The Grand Imam of al-Azhar , also known as Grand Sheikh of al-Azhar, currently Ahmed el-Tayeb, is a prestigious and a prominent official title in Egypt. He is considered by some Muslims to be the highest authority in Sunni Islamic thought and Islamic jurisprudence and holds great influence on followers of the theological Ash'ari and Maturidi traditions worldwide. The Grand Imam heads the Al-Azhar Al Sharif, al-Azhar Mosque, and by extension al-Azhar University, and is responsible for official religious matters along with the Grand Mufti of Egypt.

History of the title
The title of the Grand Imam of al-Azhar was officially established in 1961. In the 14th century the head of al-Azhar was granted the title of Mushrif of al-Azhar, then later Nazir  of Al-Azhar and, during the Ottoman Empire, the Grand Sheikh of al-Azhar. Today the bearer of the title also carries the title of the Grand Sheikh.

See Also

 List of Grand Imams of al-Azhar

References

Further reading
 
 
 

Al-Azhar
Imams
Muslim scholars of Islamic jurisprudence
Titles
Religious leadership roles
Titles in Egypt
Islam in Egypt